Jingle All the Way is a 2011 American stop motion animated children's television special produced for Hallmark Channel, directed by Chel White and produced at Bent Image Lab. The show is inspired by Hallmark Cards' 2010 stuffed toy Jingle the Husky Pup and its accompanying interactive storybook, Jingle All the Way. The special premiered on the Hallmark Channel on November 25, 2011.

Plot
A young boy named Andrew visits a Christmas tree farm with his family a few days before the holidays. Andrew instantly bonds with a young Husky pup named Jingle, who is searching for a home for Christmas. As the boy rides away, unable to keep him, the pup escapes and embarks on a snowy journey to find his friend again. Guided by a wise cardinal and the sound of jingle bells, Jingle receives the help he needs from Santa just in time for Christmas morning.

Reception
In reviewing the 2011 television holiday special programs, Mike Hale of The New York Times called Jingle All the Way "...by far the best of the bunch. In addition to its charming art and pleasantly low-key storytelling, “Jingle” stands apart from the other holiday programs by not focusing on the manufacturing or delivery of toys." Hale also mentions, "For some honest emotion, and a combination of retro holiday spirit with adventurous animation, tune in for Jingle All the Way...(it) looks like something you’d see at a European animation festival or late at night on Adult Swim, but it is also gentle and completely Hallmark-appropriate."

Sequel
The sequel, Jingle and Bell's Christmas Star, was released on the Hallmark Channel on November 23, 2012. This special introduces Bell, another plush toy in Hallmark's Husky Pups line. This show features a rendition of the song Jingle Bells performed by country music star Keith Urban.

See also
 Jingle All the Way, 1996 film
 Jingle Bells, popular traditional winter holiday song

References

External links
 
http://www.animationmagazine.net/events/annecy-announces-2012-festival-lineup/
http://animest.ro/the-anim-est-trophy-leaves-to-belgium.aspx
http://www.cartoonbrew.com/biz/hallmark-channel-announced-original-animated-special-jingle-all-the-way-46794.html

2011 television films
2011 films
Christmas television specials
Films using stop-motion animation